Disney Dreamlight Valley is an upcoming life simulation adventure game developed by Gameloft Montreal and published by Gameloft. The game has players tend to a magical valley populated by various Disney and Pixar characters who previously underwent a curse that caused them to lose their memories of their lives in the valley.

The game was released in early access for Nintendo Switch, PlayStation 4, PlayStation 5, Windows, Xbox One, and Xbox Series X/S on September 6, 2022, while the macOS version released in early access on December 6, 2022, alongside the game's second content update. While payment for a "Founder's Pack" or an Xbox Game Pass subscription is needed to play the game in early access, it will be fully released as a free-to-play game in 2023.

Gameplay 
Disney Dreamlight Valley takes place in the titular "Dreamlight Valley", a magical valley with various biomes populated by Disney and Pixar characters. The game features nonlinear gameplay similar to Nintendo's Animal Crossing games where players take control of a customizable human player character living in the valley. The valley is synced to real time based on the time set on the player's console or computer.

The player can explore the valley to gather resources and use their magic to clear away "Night Thorns", unwanted plants with dark magic that spawn throughout the valley. Foods can be cooked into various meals at a cooking station such as an oven or a campfire, while other resources can be crafted into materials or furniture at a crafting station. The player can eat food to replenish energy, which is required to use magic-imbued tools including a pickaxe, a shovel, a fishing rod, and a watering can; meals can replenish greater amounts of energy than foods grown, harvested, or purchased in the valley, and can make the player "well fed", which gives them a movement speed boost. Furniture and certain objects can be placed and rearranged in the valley or inside the player's house, and the player can also move and rotate buildings in the valley to their liking. The player can also change their outfit and appearance at any time, clothing can be customized further by the player with a clothes designer option called "Touch of Magic". Unlike in the Animal Crossing games, the player's tools, clothing, and furniture do not take up space in their inventory; tools are selected using an option wheel and never break from use, while the inventory screen contains separate "wardrobe" and "furniture" options for clothing and furniture respectively.

The player can earn a currency called "Star Coins" during gameplay, usually by selling most items in their inventory to Goofy at various stalls run by him throughout the valley. Star Coins can be spent on crops and seeds sold by Goofy at his stalls, materials sold by Kristoff at his stall, certain foods that are only available at Remy's restaurant, or on clothes and furniture sold by Scrooge McDuck at his store. They can also be spent on new buildings or building upgrades (all handled in-universe by Scrooge's "McDuck Construction" company) that provide additional benefits, such as more items available at Goofy's stalls or more space in the player's house, or on wells strewn throughout the valley that allows the player to fast travel to different biomes.

The player can interact with and befriend the villagers, including heroes and villains. The player can build up a "friendship level" with that villager by having a daily discussion with them, giving them gifts, completing quests they assign the player, and (except for characters who can only swim in the valley's waters) hanging out with them and doing activities, including gardening, mining, digging, harvesting, and fishing; doing specific activities with a land-based villager, depending on the role the player assigns the villager at friendship level two, will earn the player more resources related to that activity. Raising a friendship level (up to level ten) with a villager will give the player rewards including Star Coins, exclusive furniture and clothes, and exclusive motifs for "Touch of Magic", as well as increased resources from hanging out with them and new quests.

Plot 

The game follows the player as they decide to spend some time away from the hustle and bustle of the city and return to their old rural home and visit the backyard play area they used to enjoy when they were younger. Leaving their backpack against the well, they lie down on the picnic blanket and fall asleep as they begin to remember and enter into a dream world. As the story progresses, players may get a strange sense of déjà vu.

Upon appearing in the titular Dreamlight Valley, the player is met by Merlin, who explains that Dreamlight Valley used to be full of Disney and Pixar characters co-existing peacefully in harmony, but that all changed with the disappearance of their beloved ruler, at which point, Night Thorns began growing around the valley, leading to "The Forgetting", where while many characters fled to their home realms for protection, others stayed, but the Night Thorns caused them to lose their memories, and the valley fell into disrepair as the Night Thorns overran it. The player decides to help restore the valley and get rid of the Night Thorns.

To start, the player is able to use their own magic, known as "Dreamlight" to clear away the Giant Night Thorns blocking access to the house that looks like their own from back in reality. After recovering a memory hidden in the Night Thorns inside, the player and Merlin decide to investigate the Dream Castle, only to find the entrance blocked by Giant Night Thorns. After performing some activities around the village and recovering the Royal Tools, including a fishing rod, shovel, watering can, and a pickaxe, which also breaks the eternal night spell over the valley, along with meeting some of the other villagers who stayed, including Mickey Mouse, Scrooge McDuck, and Goofy, the player is able to clear away the Giant Night Thorns and regain access to the Dream Castle. Inside, doorways to various realms where the other villagers had fled when The Forgetting came are found, but they all have been sealed by Night Thorns. The player will need to collect more Dreamlight to unlock the doors to visit the realms, help the characters inside with their problems, and once accomplished, be able to bring them back to the Dreamlight Valley to help restore it. Along the way, they help Scrooge and Goofy reopen their businesses, help Remy reopen his restaurant for the characters to dine at, fix up the garden for WALL-E to grow crops in, repair a canoe for Moana to catch fish with, and provide housing for many of the characters returning to Dreamlight Valley through Scrooge's personal "McDuck Construction Company". The player also opens up other regions of the valley blocked by Giant Night Thorns, allowing further exploration, meeting other characters who stayed in the valley, and helping them as well, such as Kristoff, Donald Duck, Minnie Mouse, Ariel, Ursula, Scar, and Mother Gothel.

Later updates added in additional characters such as Olaf, Mirabel Madrigal, Simba, and Nala.

Characters 
Disney Dreamlight Valley features several Disney and Pixar characters who reside in the valley as "villagers".

Characters whose names are italicized are currently not available in the game but are confirmed to be added in a later update.

Additionally, Pua from Moana appears as an unlockable companion (pet) for the player. This also marks the final performance of Pat Carroll as Ursula, who died on July 30, 2022.

Reception

Early access 
Disney Dreamlight Valley received a positive reception from critics upon its early access release in September 2022.

Sam Loveridge of GamesRadar+ appreciated the quality-to-life improvements to the game's tools in contrast to Animal Crossing and liked the presence of the Disney characters that lived in the titular Dreamlight Valley, which she said had "some truly brilliant dialogue and narrative flourishes," while saying that certain resources (such as, for her, seaweed) were too scarce. Josh Broadwell of Nintendo Life gave the Nintendo Switch version 7 out of 10 stars, writing he found the game to have "strong worldbuilding", finding its plot to be "an unexpected and even poignant bit of commentary about growing up in general", but believed that the game's Switch optimization was subpar with significant menu lag and game crashes. Claire Crossman of Common Sense Media gave Disney Dreamlight Valley a grade of 5 out of 5 stars, praised the depiction of positive messages and role models, saying the game promotes the importance of helping others and encourages creative expression, applauding the diverse representations across the customization of the player character, writing the game offers an avatar creation system "uniquely diverse and inclusive," while appreciating the interactions between the player character and their environment. Josh Broadwell of IGN gave the game a grade of 8 out of 10 and called it an "awesome life simulator that flexes its iconic characters to riveting, satisfying effect," asserted the story manages to be clever and creative, appreciated the relationships players can forge with the villagers across their different quests, and complimented the customization of the player character and their environment, stating, "Disney Dreamlight Valley feels impressively like a finished product for an early access game."

Player count 
On September 15, 2022, the official Disney Dreamlight Valley Twitter account tweeted that over one million players have played the game.

Accolades

Notes

References

External links 
 
 

Upcoming video games scheduled for 2023
Crossover video games
Disney video games
Early access video games
Gameloft games
Life simulation games
MacOS games
Nintendo Switch games
PlayStation 4 games
PlayStation 5 games
Xbox One games
Xbox Series X and Series S games
Windows games